The BH postcode area, also known as the Bournemouth postcode area, is a group of 26 postcode districts in southern England, within eleven post towns. These cover east Dorset (including Bournemouth, Poole, Broadstone, Christchurch, Ferndown, Swanage, Verwood, Wareham and Wimborne) and part of south-west Hampshire (including New Milton and Ringwood).



Coverage
The approximate coverage of the postcode districts:

|-
! BH1
| BOURNEMOUTH
| Bournemouth Town Centre, East Cliff, Springbourne, Boscombe town centre
| Bournemouth, Christchurch and Poole
|-
! BH2
| BOURNEMOUTH
| Bournemouth Town Centre, West Cliff
| Bournemouth, Christchurch and Poole 
|-
! BH3
| BOURNEMOUTH
| Talbot Woods, Winton south
| Bournemouth, Christchurch and Poole 
|-
! BH4
| BOURNEMOUTH
| Westbourne, Branksome Woods
| Bournemouth, Christchurch and Poole 
|-
! BH5
| BOURNEMOUTH
| Boscombe, Pokesdown
| Bournemouth, Christchurch and Poole 
|-
! BH6
| BOURNEMOUTH
| Southbourne, Tuckton, Wick
| Bournemouth, Christchurch and Poole 
|-
! BH7
| BOURNEMOUTH
| Littledown, Iford
| Bournemouth, Christchurch and Poole 
|-
! BH8
| BOURNEMOUTH
| Bournemouth railway station, Malmesbury Park, Richmond Park, Queens Park, Charminster, Strouden Park, Townsend, Holdenhurst, Throop
| Bournemouth, Christchurch and Poole 
|-
! BH9
| BOURNEMOUTH
| Winton, Moordown, Throop, Muscliff
| Bournemouth, Christchurch and Poole 
|-
! BH10
| BOURNEMOUTH
| Kinson, East Howe, Northbourne, Redhill, Ensbury Park, Slades Farm, Talbot Village, Wallisdown
| Bournemouth, Christchurch and Poole 
|-
! BH11
| BOURNEMOUTH
| Kinson, Bear Cross, West Howe, Wallisdown, Bearwood
| Bournemouth, Christchurch and Poole 
|-
! BH12
| POOLE
| Branksome, Alderney, Upper Parkstone, Newtown, Bournemouth University
| Bournemouth, Christchurch and Poole 
|-
! BH13
| POOLE
| Canford Cliffs, Sandbanks, Branksome Park, Brownsea Island
| Bournemouth, Christchurch and Poole; Dorset
|-
! BH14
| POOLE
| Lower Parkstone, Lilliput, Penn Hill
| Bournemouth, Christchurch and Poole 
|-
! BH15
| POOLE
| Poole Town Centre, Hamworthy, Longfleet, Oakdale, Poole Harbour minor islands
| Bournemouth, Christchurch and Poole; Dorset
|-
! BH16
| POOLE
| Upton, Turlin Moor, Lytchett Minster, Lytchett Matravers, Holton Heath
| Dorset; Bournemouth, Christchurch and Poole 
|-
! BH17
| POOLE
| Canford Heath, Creekmoor, Waterloo
| Bournemouth, Christchurch and Poole 
|-
! BH18
| BROADSTONE
| Broadstone
| Bournemouth, Christchurch and Poole 
|-
! BH19
| SWANAGE
| Swanage, Studland, Langton Matravers, Worth Matravers
| Dorset 
|-
! BH20
| WAREHAM
| Wareham, Arne, Corfe Castle, West Lulworth, Wool, Bovington Camp, Bere Regis
| Dorset 
|-
! BH21
| WIMBORNE
| Wimborne, Corfe Mullen, Sturminster Marshall, Cranborne, Merley, Oakley, Three Legged Cross, Knowlton
| Dorset; Bournemouth, Christchurch and Poole
|-
! BH22
| FERNDOWN
| Ferndown, West Moors, West Parley
| Dorset
|-
! BH23
| CHRISTCHURCH
| Christchurch, Highcliffe, Burton, Sopley, Bransgore, Hurn, Bournemouth Airport
| Bournemouth, Christchurch and Poole; New Forest
|-
! BH24
| RINGWOOD
| Ringwood, St Leonards, Ashley Heath, Burley, Holmsley
| New Forest; Dorset
|-
! BH25
| NEW MILTON
| New Milton, Barton on Sea, Bashley, Wootton, Ossemsley
| New Forest
|-
! BH31
| VERWOOD
| Verwood
| Dorset
|}

Map

See also
List of postcode areas in the United Kingdom
Postcode Address File

References

External links

Postcode areas covering South West England